Keramoti is a mountain village in the northeastern part of the island of Naxos in the Cyclades, Greece.  Keramoti is part of the municipal unit of Drymalia. It is situated 2 km southwest of Koronos and 12 km east of Naxos town. Together with Apeiranthos, Koronos and Komiaki, it is the emery producing area of Naxos.

Historical population

See also
List of communities of the Cyclades

References 

Naxos
Populated places in Naxos (regional unit)